Nikolas "Nik" Berger (born March 18, 1974 in Salzburg) is an Austrian beach volleyball player.

Berger began his career in indoor volleyball in 1986. Among his major achievements are the Austrian national championships runner-up with PLO/ASV Salzburg in 1992 and after he moved to the capital for playing with the club Donaukraft Vienna, he was four times Austrian champion and Austrian Cup winner. At the 1999 European Championship, play at home in Vienna, Berger finished his career in indoor volleyball.

In 1993, he had also begun parallel career with the beach volleyball. With Oliver Stamm, Berger competed at the 2000 Summer Olympics, in Sydney, but they lost to the Brazilian duo Zé Marco de Melo/Ricardo Santos. At the 2004 Summer Olympics, in Athens, he plays with Florian Gosch after an injury to his season partner Clemens Doppler. A year earlier he won the European Championships with Doppler.

After the 2005 season the duo Berger/Doppler went their separate ways. Berger plays with Robert Nowotny until the 2008 season.

References

External links
 
 
 

1974 births
Living people

Austrian beach volleyball players
Men's beach volleyball players
Olympic beach volleyball players of Austria
Beach volleyball players at the 2000 Summer Olympics
Beach volleyball players at the 2004 Summer Olympics
Sportspeople from Salzburg